GWR No. 12 is a Sentinel geared steam locomotive which was built for the Great Western Railway and delivered in 1926. Its Sentinel works number is 6515. It was equipped to work train vacuum brakes and to provide steam heat for passenger trains. Initially, it was based at Swindon and used to work trains on the Malmesbury branch. Later, it worked at Brentford Goods Yard.  These trials were not a great success and the locomotive was withdrawn in December 1926 and returned to Sentinel in January 1927.

Rebuilding
The locomotive was rebuilt by Sentinel with a larger boiler in 1927. It then underwent further trials as follows:

 1927, Shropshire and Montgomeryshire Railway
 1927, Further trials on the GWR
 1927–1929, Works shunter for Sentinel at Shrewsbury
 1929, Trial on the London, Midland and Scottish Railway (LMS) at Shrewsbury
 1929–1934, Works shunter for Sentinel at Shrewsbury again
 1934, Sold to Thomas E. Grey Ltd, Burton Latimer, Northamptonshire. Here, it was given the number 2 and the name Isebrook.

Withdrawal
In 1958, the locomotive was withdrawn. The boiler and parts of the engine were removed and it was used as a brake van. In 1972, it was condemned and was then bought for preservation and moved to the Buckinghamshire Railway Centre at Quainton.

Restoration
Restoration took seven years and included fitting a reconditioned boiler and engine. The engine was first steamed in preservation on 26 August 1979. In 1981, vacuum brake equipment was refitted for passenger train working.

Visits
The locomotive has visited other sites since restoration. In May 2001, it moved to Rosemary Vineyards on the Isle of Wight, and then on to the Lavender Line. In June 2008, it returned to Quainton. Since July 2012, it has been working on the Chinnor and Princes Risborough Railway, where it is expected to stay until September 2012. On 15/16 September 2012 it will make a brief visit to Didcot Railway Centre for the "All in a Day's Work" steam gala. In September 2019 the locomotive visited Cholsey & Wallingford Railway for the Sentinel Gala.

References

Sentinel locomotives
0012
0-4-0T locomotives
Railway locomotives introduced in 1926
Standard gauge steam locomotives of Great Britain

Shunting locomotives